Naoji (written:  or ) is a masculine Japanese given name. Notable people with the name include:

Naoji Doi, Imperial Japanese Navy admiral
, Japanese footballer
, Japanese rower

Japanese masculine given names